Paraclinus arcanus is a species of labrisomid blenny native to the Atlantic coast of Brazil. This species can reach a length of  SL.

References

arcanus
Fish of Brazil
Endemic fauna of Brazil
Southeastern South American coastal fauna
Fish described in 2002